Runar Tafjord (born December 14, 1957 in Langevåg, Norway) is a Norwegian French horn player, brother of the tubaist Stein Erik Tafjord, and uncle of the French horn player Hild Sofie Tafjord. He is best known for being part of The Brazz Brothers.

Career 
Tafjord is a graduate of the Norwegian Academy of Music in Oslo. He has for many years played in various Scandinavian orchestras, including Oslo Filharmoniske Orkester, Den Norske Operas Orkester, Bergen Filharmoniske Orkester and 'Gothenburg Philharmonic Orchestra'. He is also a widely used solo artist and studio musician and is one of only five chosen Scandinavian horn players who play jazz. In addition, he is a highly sought after orchestra conductor and instructor for brass ensembles. In 2011 he received the "Statens arbeidsstipend" from the Norwegian government.

Discography 

Within The Brazz Brothers
1987: Brazzy Landscapes (Odin Records), with Phil Minton & Egil "Bop" Johansen
1993: Norwegian Air (Norsk Plateproduksjon)
1994: All Included (Norsk Plateproduksjon)
1996: Brazzy Voices (In+Out Records)
1999: Ngoma (Brazz Records)
2012: Aquarium (Brazz Records)

With Jan Eggum
1992: Nesten Ikke Tilstede (Grappa Music)

With Mikhail Alperin
2000: Portrait (Jaro Medien)

With Povl Dissing & Benny Andersen
2010: For Fuld Udblæsning (CVP Broadcast)

References

External links 
Runar Tafjord, French Horn at Brazzbrothers.com (in Norwegian)

1957 births
Musicians from Langevåg
Living people
Norwegian jazz horn players
Orchestra leaders
21st-century trumpeters
The Brazz Brothers members